The Tannheimer Tal ("Tannheim valley") is a high valley, at an elevation of about 1,100 metres, in the Tannheim Mountains, which are part of the Allgäu Alps in the Austrian state of Tyrol (county of Reutte).It is a left sided tributary to the lech river.

Geography 
The Tannheimer Tal branches off the upper Lech valley as a hanging valley near Weißenbach, runs via the Gaicht Pass and the lake of Haldensee to the Oberjoch Pass in Bavaria. East of it, the  Nesselwängler Ache, Warpsbach and Weißenbach drain into the Lech, to the west the Berger Ache and Vils rivers flow through it. The Vils runs in a wide bow around the  Tannheim Mountains and also empties into the Lech at the town of  Vils.

External links 
 
 Land Tirol: Planungsverband 01 - Tannheimertal
 Tannheimer Tal in Tirol Atlas der Universität Innsbruck

Ski areas and resorts in Austria
Regions of Tyrol (state)
Valleys of Tyrol (state)
Allgäu Alps
Reutte District